Ronald Clayton (born 18 January 1937) is an English former professional footballer who played as an inside right in the Football League for Brighton & Hove Albion. He was on the books of Arsenal without playing for their first team, and also played non-league football for Hereford United, Hastings United, Rugby Town and Hinckley Athletic. In 1965, he played abroad in the Eastern Canada Professional Soccer League with Toronto Inter-Roma. In 1969, he played in the National Soccer League with Toronto Ukraina. 

In 1977, he was the head coach for London City in the National Soccer League.

References

1937 births
Living people
Footballers from Kingston upon Hull
English footballers
Association football inside forwards
Hereford United F.C. players
Arsenal F.C. players
Brighton & Hove Albion F.C. players
Hastings United F.C. (1948) players
Rugby Town F.C. (1945) players
Hinckley Athletic F.C. players
Toronto Roma players
Toronto Ukrainians players
Southern Football League players
English Football League players
Eastern Canada Professional Soccer League players
Canadian National Soccer League coaches
Canadian National Soccer League players
English football managers